Nainakala Ojha (Nepali: नैनकला ओझा) is a Nepalese communist politician and member of the National Assembly. In 2018 she was elected unopposed in Province No. 1 for the Communist Party of Nepal (Unified Marxist–Leninist) with a four-year term. She is a founder member of the Taplejung All Nepal Women's Association (Akhil Nepal Mahila Sangha).

References 

Nepal Communist Party (NCP) politicians
Members of the National Assembly (Nepal)
Communist Party of Nepal (Unified Marxist–Leninist) politicians
Year of birth missing (living people)
Living people